Roskear Croft is a hamlet north of Camborne, Cornwall, England.

References

Hamlets in Cornwall